Robert Anthony Buell (September 10, 1940 – September 25, 2002) was an American serial killer, child murderer, serial rapist, and former planning department worker from Akron, Ohio. He was convicted of the July 17, 1982 murder of 11-year-old Krista Lea Harrison.

Buell was executed by lethal injection on September 25, 2002. His final meal was a single black unpitted olive. In 2010, eight years after his death, he was found to have also killed Tina Marie Harmon.

Murder cases 

On July 17, 1982, Buell was reportedly seen abducting Krista Harrison in a park in Marshallville, Ohio. Harrison's body was found six days after her kidnapping. She had been sexually assaulted and strangled. Two other young girls have been thought to have also been victims of Buell: Tina Marie Harmon, age 12, murdered in 1981; and Deborah Kaye Smith, age 10, murdered in 1983.

Although strong evidence is present linking Buell to all three cases, Buell was only charged with the murder of Krista Harrison. He has since been linked by DNA evidence to Tina Harmon's murder. Buell was also a serial rapist. In 1983, Buell raped and tortured a woman who was able to escape and notify police, an event that ultimately led to his arrest. He also raped another woman. Buell pleaded no contest to these crimes and received a 121-year sentence.

Buell was sentenced to death for Krista Harrison's murder on April 11, 1984. Eighteen years later, on September 25, 2002, he was executed by lethal injection, still denying involvement in the Harrison murder.

This case was presented as "Material Evidence" in Forensic Files, season 5, episode 8, made before Buell's execution. Information regarding the 2010 DNA match was later added to the end of the episode.

See also 
 List of people executed in Ohio
 List of people executed in the United States in 2002
 List of serial killers in the United States

References 

1940 births
2002 deaths
20th-century American criminals
21st-century executions by Ohio
21st-century executions of American people
American murderers of children
American people convicted of rape
Executed American serial killers
Executed people from Ohio
Male serial killers
People convicted of murder by Ohio
People executed by Ohio by lethal injection
People from Akron, Ohio
People from Norwood, Ohio
Torture in the United States